Aslak Falch (born 25 May 1992) is a Norwegian football goalkeeper who plays for Sandnes Ulf.

Falch was born in Hundvåg, where he also grew up, and played for Hundvåg FK until February 2007, when he joined Viking's youth team. He made his senior debut on 25 October 2009 against Strømsgodset IF, as a substitute when Artur Kotenko was sent off. After the 2011-season he signed for Sandnes Ulf, and when Bo Andersen in June 2012 announced that he would retire after the season, Sandnes Ulf played with Falch as their first-choice goalkeeper in Tippeligaen for the rest of the season.

Falch is the grandson of former Norway international defender Edgar Falch.

Career statistics

References

1992 births
Living people
Sportspeople from Stavanger
Norwegian footballers
Norway under-21 international footballers
Viking FK players
Sandnes Ulf players
Sarpsborg 08 FF players
IL Hødd players
IFK Norrköping players
Vålerenga Fotball players
Eliteserien players
Allsvenskan players
Norwegian First Division players

Association football goalkeepers